E-ferry Ellen is a pioneering electric car ferry. She operates the 22 NM route between the islands of Ærø  and Als in Southern Denmark.

History
Ellen was developed under E-Ferry, an EU-backed project costing EUR 21.3 million. Although this is around 40% more expensive than a conventional vessel, operating costs are 75% lower. It is expected that she will save the release of 2,000 tonnes of CO2 per year.

The ferry was built by Søby Værft A/S, with sections fabricated in Szczecin, Poland. In September 2016, 22 sections were welded together and the hull was towed to Søby on Ærø for outfitting.

Project evaluation
The E-ferry project ended successfully in June 2020, with Ellen in service. Evaluation of the project shows

85% energy efficiency (grid-to-propeller)
1600 kWh consumption (per roundtrip of  22 nautical miles; approx. 40 km)
4-8 years before higher investment cost turns into savings from lower operational costs
2,520 tonnes/year CO2 emissions saved (compared to a modern diesel ferry; using electricity produced on Ærøby from clean renewable sources; 2,010 tonnes if powered from the standard Danish grid mix)
CO2 emissions from battery production estimated 215-430 tonnes (3 months emissions from the best modern diesel ferry)

Layout
Ellen can carry 30 vehicles and 200 passengers. She was designed to minimise weight. Her passenger areas are on the same level as the open car deck. She does not have ramps, instead using those on shore. The hull is steel but the bridge is made of aluminum. Deck furniture is made from recycled paper rather than wood, giving the ferry a total weight of 650 tonnes.

Ellens batteries were developed by Leclanché of Switzerland and are reported to be Lithium Nickel Manganese Cobalt Oxide. They are split between two battery rooms below deck and have a capacity of 4.3 MWh, larger than any other electric vessel. She is one of the first such vessels to have no emergency generator. A charging arm on the shore ramp moves with the tide and allows battery recharging while loading. Charging time is about 20 minutes.

Service
Ellen was built to operate the 22 nautical miles between the islands of Ærø  and Als in Southern Denmark. She replaced MF Skjoldnæs from 15 August 2019.

Gallery

References

External links
 

Ferries of Denmark
Electric boats
2016 ships
Ships built in Szczecin